Absolute Genius with Dick and Dom is a British television series broadcast on CBBC and presented by Richard McCourt and Dominic Wood (Dick and Dom). In each episode the duo study the work of a genius (3 in later series) and attempt to recreate one of their ideas, occasionally with some improvements using technology not available in the subject's lifetime. They are assisted by Fran Scott (credited as Science Consultant) and experts in the field of what is being studied.

The series was one of several commissioned by the BBC to interest young children in science, it follows the success of Professor Brian Cox who has been credited with making teenagers interested in the subject. The BBC chose Dick and Dom as the appropriate presenters for the intended age group.

In November 2014, Dick and Dom won the 2014 Children's Presenter BAFTA Award for series 2 of the show 

In summer 2014, CBBC renewed the program for a third and fourth series. The third was called Appsolute Genius and explored video games, while the fourth, Absolute Genius: Super Tech looked at technology from around the world. The fifth and final series, titled Absolute Genius: Monster Builds, was filmed and released in 2016 and looked at geniuses behind monster builds.

Series overview

Episode list

Series 1 (2013)

Series 2 (2014)

Series 3 (2014-2015) 
In this series Dick and Dom move on from science and now look at all the apps that people can download to their iPads, phones and computers. At the end of each show they try to make their own game in real life. This last segment is narrated by YouTube personality Joseph Garrett (AKA "Stampy Cat"). Series 3 ran for 8 Episodes over 8 weeks. Series three was titled Appsolute Genius with Dick & Dom. The series also ran a competition to create a new app and game for the CBBC website, the winner of which was 14-year-old Alex, which was later made into 'Escargot Escape Artistes'.

Series 4 (2015-2016) 
In series 4 Dick and Dom are now looking at super tech from all over the world from tech that can save lives to tech that you can buy to tech that is out of this world, and at the end of each show they try to make their own super tech and beat the challenge set to them. Series 4 ran for 8 Episodes over 8 weeks. Series four was titled Absolute Genius Super Tech with Dick & Dom.

Series 5 (2016) 
In Series 5 Dick and Dom and Fran are looking at monster builds. The fifth series was confirmed on 2 June 2016. Filming took place throughout 2016 The fifth series began airing on CBBC on 19 October 2016.

References

External links
 

2010s British children's television series
2013 British television series debuts
2016 British television series endings
BBC children's television shows
BBC television documentaries about science
British documentary television series about science
Documentary television series about technology
English-language television shows